Kai-David Bösing (born 7 March 1994) is a German professional footballer who plays as midfielder for Mittelrheinliga club SV Eintracht Hohkeppel.

Career
In his youth, Bösing played at Roda JC in the Netherlands. In 2012, he moved from the youth academy to the second team. In the 2014–15 season, Bösing was included in the first team squad, which played in the Dutch second league, the Eerste Divisie. However, he never made an appearance.

In the summer of 2015 he joined Fortuna Köln. He made his 3. Liga debut on 15 August 2015, matchday 3. He came on as a substitute in the 68th minute for Kusi Kwame in the 2–4 defeat against Hansa Rostock.

For the 2022–23 season, Bösing joined fifth-tier Mittelrheinliga club Eintracht Hohkeppel.

References

External links
 
 

Living people
1994 births
Sportspeople from Aachen
German footballers
Footballers from North Rhine-Westphalia
Association football midfielders
3. Liga players
Regionalliga players
Eerste Divisie players
Oberliga (football) players
Roda JC Kerkrade players
SC Fortuna Köln players
Alemannia Aachen players
MVV Maastricht players
German expatriate footballers
German expatriate sportspeople in the Netherlands
Expatriate footballers in the Netherlands